Eupithecia calligraphata is a moth in the family Geometridae. It is found in Turkey.

References

Moths described in 1929
calligraphata
Moths of Asia